Aubin is an unincorporated community in East Baton Rouge Parish, Louisiana, United States.

References

Unincorporated communities in East Baton Rouge Parish, Louisiana
Unincorporated communities in Louisiana